Neighborhoods of Kaunas and its metropolitan area:

Akademija
Aleksotas
Centras 
Dainava
Domeikava
Eiguliai 
Garliava
Giraitė
Gričiupis
Karmėlava
Senamiestis 
Panemunė 
Petrašiūnai
Ramučiai
Raudondvaris
Šančiai
Šilainiai 
Vilijampolė
Žaliakalnis

References
Wikimapia

Neighbourhoods in Lithuania